Andreja Klepač and María José Martínez Sánchez were the defending champions, but chose not to participate.

Miyu Kato and Makoto Ninomiya won the title, defeating Andrea Sestini Hlaváčková and Barbora Strýcová in the final, 6–4, 6–4.

Seeds

Draw

Draw

References
Main Draw

Toray Pan Pacific Open - Doubles
2018 Doubles
2018 Toray Pan Pacific Open